"True To Yourself" is a German only release taken from Australian recording artist Vanessa Amorosi's second studio album Change. The single was released on 24 February 2003 as the album's final single and peaked at No.99.

It was included on the "Top Of The Pops 2003" compilation album.

In 2002, Amorosi re-recorded the song as a duet with Olivia Newton-John and it was to be included on Newton-John's album 2 (as track two). However, the track was dropped at the last minute due to contractual disagreements between Amorosi's Transistor Music and Newton-John's Universal Music labels. Both women declared to feel very sad about this situation and have been quick to say that there is no problem between them, but that it is simply a contractual matter.

Lyrics
Lyrically, the song is about self-empowerment. The chorus includes the lyrics;
"Sometimes you gotta look a little harder, Sometimes you gotta be, be smarter, Hold on just a little bit longer, Just be true to yourself"

Promotion
Amorosi performed "True to Yourself" on Top of the Pops and the hugely successful long-running show Wetten, dass..? which screens throughout Europe.

Track listing 
CD Maxi

Charts

Release history

References 

2002 songs
2003 singles
Vanessa Amorosi songs
Songs written by Gary Barlow
Pop ballads